The 2011 Kenyan Premier League was the eighth season of the Kenyan Premier League since it was established in 2003 and the forty-eighth season of top division football in Kenya since 1963. It began on 26 February with Rangers and Gor Mahia and ended on 26 November with Ulinzi Stars and Rangers.

Ulinzi Stars were the defending champions, but Tusker eventually won the league, their ninth ever title since 1963. However, Sofapaka, the 2010 FKF Cup champions, took home the 2011 Kenyan Super Cup after beating Ulinzi Stars 1-0.

A total of 16 teams competed for the league. Bandari and Congo JMJ United were both promoted and eventually relegated, taking the places of Red Berets and Mahakama.

Gor Mahia versus AFC Leopards on 24 July 2011 had an attendance of 23,734, the highest of the league that year. The 2011 KPL drew an average attendance of 2,452 per match.

Changes from last season
Relegated from Premier League
 Mahakama
 Red Berets

Promoted from Nationwide League
 Bandari
 Congo JMJ United

Teams

Stadia and locations

League table

Results

Top scorers
Kenyan Premier League: Top 10 Scorers
As of December 16, 2011.

Last updated: 16 December 2011Source: 2011 Kenyan Premier League: Top Scorers

See also
 2011 DStv Super Cup
 2011 KPL Top 8 Cup
 2011 Kenyan Super Cup

References

Kenya
Kenya
Kenyan
1
2011